Bjerke is a Norwegian surname, also found throughout Scandinavia. 
Notable people with the surname include:

André Bjerke (1918–1985), Norwegian writer and poet
Björn Bjerke, Swedish economist
Desiree Bjerke, Norwegian skeleton racer
Ejlert Bjerke (1887–1963), Norwegian writer
Espen Harald Bjerke, Norwegian cross-country skier
Ferdinand Bjerke, Norwegian railway engineer.
Harald Bjerke (1860–1926), Norwegian businessperson
Ingvald Bjerke (1907–1990), Norwegian boxer who competed in the 1928 Summer Olympics
Juul Bjerke (1928–2014), Norwegian economist
Kristin Blystad-Bjerke, Norwegian football player
Olaf Bjerke (1893–1957), Norwegian trade unionist
Paul Bjerke, Norwegian media scientist
Per Arne Bjerke (1952-2015), Norwegian journalist and politician
Regine Bjerke, Norwegian judge
Rune Bjerke, Norwegian businessperson and politician for the Labour Party
Siri Bjerke, Norwegian Government minister of in the Labour Party
Svein Bjerke, Norwegian professor emeritus at the University of Oslo
Trine Bjerke Rønning, Norwegian football player

References

Norwegian-language surnames